Aparri (Ibanag: Ili nat Aparri;), officially the Municipality of Aparri,  is a 1st class municipality in the province of , Philippines. According to the 2020 census, it has a population of 68,839 people.

It sits at the mouth of the Cagayan River, the longest river in the Philippines.

Aparri is a bustling municipality and the primary growth center of Northern Cagayan. It serves as the center of education, commerce and culture in the northern part of the Region which includes towns of the first and second districts of Cagayan as well as the towns of Apayao and some towns of Ilocos Norte. It serves as the show window of commerce and finance,economic transformation, information technology, livelihood development, fashion and culture, leisure and entertainment, agricultural modernization, and course good local governance.

Aparri has an approximate income of ₱250 million. The valley has been one of the largest tobacco-producing sections in the Philippines, and the town has a considerable coastwise trade.

It has a meteorological station located in Barangay Punta where the Cagayan River meets the Babuyan Channel.

It also administers Fuga Island, which is part of the Babuyan Group and is much closer to Claveria. In the near future, it will become the next city in the province of Cagayan.

History

Aparri was formerly a Japanese trading post because of its location at the northern tip of Luzon at the mouth of the Cagayan River. It was the main area for trade for Japan in the island of Luzon. Much of the area was once home to the native Ibanag people, who were at the time in alliance with Japan as an early form of an informal protectorate city-state. It was formally established under Spanish rule in 1605 after the Spanish Crown seized the Philippines and made it part of the Spanish East Indies. The river where Aparri is in was the site of the famed 1582 Cagayan battles, the only major skirmish between Spanish Tercios and Japanese Ronin (Masterless Samurai). Since it was on the route of Spanish Galleons during the great tobacco monopoly in the 16th to the 17th centuries, Aparri was therefore made one of the major Spanish ports of the Galleon Trade on May 11, 1680. The original inhabitants of this town were the Ybanags. Later, as the Spaniards settled and because of its strategic location, Ilocanos and Chinese people settled in the area.

In 11 May 1926 Joaquín Loriga  and Eduardo Gallarza landed on his first-ever long way in autogyro from Spain to Manila. In the years before the outbreak of World War II, it became a transshipment point for smuggled goods from China, Taiwan, and other neighboring Southeast Asian nations. Donald Blackburn's guerrilla forces and the local troops of the Philippine Commonwealth Army and Philippine Constabulary are supported the Sixth United States Army Force B, in the capture of Aparri on 20 June 1945.

Geography

Barangays
Aparri is politically subdivided into 42 barangays. These barangays are headed by elected officials: Barangay Captain, Barangay Council, whose members are called Barangay Councilors. All are elected every three years.

Climate

Demographics

Economy

Tourism

Aparri is known for its foods such as the "bulung-unas", or Ribbon Fish (aka Belt Fish), which are in abundance during January and early February. "Kilawin naguilas-asan" is a fillet of smaller "bulung-unas" which are leftover baits, soaked in Ilocos vinegar, seasoned with salt and pepper, finely cut onions and ginger. Ludong, a variety of Pacific salmon, is the Philippines' most expensive fish, ranging from 4,000 pesos to 5,000 per kilo. Because of its price and its distinct taste and smell, it is also nicknamed "President Fish". Caught only in the Aparri delta when, after a heavy rainfall, these fish are washed down by the fast raging water from the south, down to the mouth of the Cagayan River where it meets the Babuyan Sea. Freshwater fish by nature, the salt water contributes to their super delicious taste. Ludong is available only in the rainy months of October and early November.

Aparri's attractions also include its sandy beaches and town fiesta. May 1 to 12 of every year, the town's fiesta celebrates the patron saint San Pedro Gonzales of Thelmo with nightly festivities at the auditorium, crowning of Miss Aparri beauty pageant and the "Comparza."

It is home to the Archdiocesan Shrine of Our Lady of the Most Holy Rosary and the Shrine of San Lorenzo Ruiz de Manila. Holy Week is celebrated in Aparri with the observance of Holy Thursday and Good Friday in the town churches. On the early hours of Easter Sunday, the "Domingo Sabet" celebrates the meeting of Jesus and the Holy Mother after the resurrection.

Government
Aparri, belonging to the first legislative district of the province of Cagayan, is governed by a mayor designated as its local chief executive and by a municipal council as its legislative body in accordance with the Local Government Code. The mayor, vice mayor, and the councilors are elected directly by the people through an election which is being held every three years.

Elected officials

Education
The Schools Division of Cagayan governs the town's public education system. The division office is a field office of the DepEd in Cagayan Valley region. The office governs the public and private elementary and public and private high schools throughout the municipality.
 Aparri East National High School
 Cagayan State University (Aparri Campus)
 Aparri West National High School 
 Aparri East Central School
 Aparri South Central School
 Aparri School of Arts and Trades
 Lyceum of Aparri
 St. Paul School of Aparri
 Aparri Kete Chinese School
 Maura Elementary School
 Punta Elementary School
 San Antonio Elementary School
 Dodan Elementary School
 Backiling Elementary School
 Bulala Sur Elementary School
 Paruddun Norte Elementary School
 Minanga Elementary School
 Sanja Elementary School
 Gaddang Elementary School
 Linao Elementary School
 Navagan Elementary School
 Aparri West Central School
 Caroronan Primary School
 Binalan Elementary School
 Bangag Elementary School
 Nanappatan Elementary School
 Zinarag Elementary School
 Plaza Primary School
 Bukig National Agricultural and Technical School

Media
Aparri's main media outlet is radio. The following are radio and TV stations in the town

Radio
Radyo Natin FM 102.1 (Manila Broadcasting Company)

Radyo Kidlat FM 103.9 (Philippine Broadcasting Service)

TV Stations
 GMA TV-13 Aparri 
 ABS-CBN TV-9 Aparri (defunct)

Notable personalities
Aparri as a birthplace has produced a number of famous personalities of various fields (e.g. Filipino actress, Filipino diplomat (1939-2016), Filipino actor and comedian): 

 Maja Ross Andres Salvador - is a Filipino actress, endorser, dancer, singer, host, producer, and talent manager. 

 Domingo Lim Siazon Jr. - was a Filipino diplomat. He served as the Director-General of the United Nations Industrial Development Organization from 1985 to 1992, the 18th Philippine Secretary of Foreign Affairs from 1995 to 2001, and the Philippine Ambassador to Japan from 1993 to 1995 (1st term) and 2001 to 2010 (2nd term).

 Catherine "Kakai" Herrera Bautista - is a Filipina actress, host, singer, and comedienne.

References

External links

Government
 
 [ Philippine Standard Geographic Code]
Philippine Census Information

General information
 Aparri | Philippines | Britannica
 Aparri Profile - Cities and Municipalities Competitive Index (dti.gov.ph)

Municipalities of Cagayan
Populated places on the Rio Grande de Cagayan